This was the first edition of the tournament.

Sebastián Báez won the title after defeating Francisco Cerúndolo 6–3, 6–7(5–7), 7–6(7–5) in the final.

Seeds

Draw

Finals

Top half

Bottom half

References

External links
Main draw
Qualifying draw

Challenger Concepción - 1